Aero Fighters 2 is a vertical-scrolling shoot 'em up arcade game released in 1994 by Video System. It is developed by SNK and released in Japan, North America and Europe. It is the second part of the Aero Fighters series followed by the third part Aero Fighters 3 and a spin-off Aero Fighters Assault. It was initially released as a cabinet token base game.

Gameplay. 

The game is played with two buttons, with the A button firing projectiles from the plane and the B button launching a special bomb attack which uses a bomb from a limited stock of bombs. Power projectiles can be obtained by destroying buildings and armored enemy planes. There are two types of Power projectiles: "P" Power projectiles, that increase the plane's firepower by one level, and "F" Power projectiles, that increase the plane's firepower to the maximum level instantly. The maximum level only lasts for a limited number of shots. When certain ground enemies and buildings are destroyed, money bonuses appear which give a set number of points based on how fast they player destroys them and how quickly they collected the bonus. When the player reaches the end of the stage, the player has to face a boss ship. There are ten levels. Once those levels are beaten, there is a character-specific ending. The game then loops with palette changes, but after the looped stages are beaten, the game truly ends.

Development and release

Reception 

In Japan, Game Machine listed Aero Fighters 2 on their September 1, 1994 issue as being the seventh most-popular arcade game at the time. In North America, RePlay reported it to be the fifth most-popular arcade game at the time. Play Meter also listed the title to be the fifty-seventh most-popular arcade game at the time. The game was met with generally positive reception from critics. It holds a 90% on the video game review aggregator GameRankings.
AllGames Kyle Knight praised the variety of ships and backgrounds, sound, level designs and gameplay but criticized its replay value. GamePros Captain Squideo gave it a generally positive review. While citing some issues with slowdown and an absence of sound effects for the player's jet, as well as a general lack of originality, he considered it an overall enjoyable shooter with fun weapons, huge bosses, and "crisp" controls. Next Generation reviewed the Neo-Geo version of the game, stating that "players with any skill will beat the game on the easy or normal level in under an hour. The higher levels offer more challenges, but not new ones".

Hobby Consolass Manuel del Campo praised the graphical design of stages and enemies despite the small size of the player's plane, music, playability and ship variety but criticized the lack of variety with sound design and "wow factor". Joypads Benji regarded the Neo Geo CD version to be disappointing, writing that "we found ourselves in front of a game which would have been all the rage (although!) On Neo cartridge five years ago. Because even soundtrack side, for CD, the result is trivial". MAN!ACs Ingo Zaborowski commended the visuals but criticized the music for being inappropriate and unmotivated, comparing the game with both Raiden II and Twin Eagle II. Mega Funs Martin Weidner visually compared the title with Last Resort and Viewpoint, criticizing the music, slowdown during gameplay and lack of additional options.

Player Ones Christophe Delpierre reviewed the Neo Geo CD version, remarking that the graphics needed more work and criticized the levels for their short length, concluding that "in short, Aero Fightere 2, without being bad, still disappoints a little. On Neo CD, we are entitled to expect much better". Like Manuel del Campo, Superjuegos Roberto Serrano praised the visual design, music, sound design and playability but criticized the occurrence of slowdown when many sprites are displayed on-screen, stating that the sequel far exceeds its predecessor. CD Consoles David Taborda commended the audiovisual presentation and playability but criticized its creativity on display and slowdown during gameplay but he nevertheless regarded the title to be a good game. Computer+Videogiochis Maurizio Miccoli reviewed the Neo Geo CD release, praising the gameplay, longevity and presentation. VideoGames Gabe Soria stated that the graphics were similar to those of the original Aero Fighters and compared the sound design with Apocalypse Now but commended its playability but noted it was neither new nor special.

Aero Fighters 2 has been met with mostly positive reception from retrospective reviewers in recent years. In 2014, HobbyConsolas identified it as one of the twenty best games for the Neo Geo AES. Nintendo Lifes Dave Frear praised the Nintendo Switch version for the addition of hi-score and caravan modes, selection of planes, enemy variety, action and multiple endings. In contrast, however, Pure Nintendo Magazines Justin Sharp commended the visual presentation and two-player mode but criticized the short length and lack of replayability.

Notes

References

External links 

 Aero Fighters 2 at Giant Bomb
 Aero Fighters 2 at Killer List of Videogames
 Aero Fighters 2 at MobyGames

1994 video games
ACA Neo Geo games
Arcade video games
Cooperative video games
Multiplayer and single-player video games
Neo Geo games
Neo Geo CD games
Nintendo Switch games
PlayStation Network games
PlayStation 4 games
SNK games
Vertically scrolling shooters
Video games featuring female protagonists
Video games scored by Soshi Hosoi
Video games set in Australia
Video games set in Bangladesh
Video games set in Brazil
Video games set in France
Video games set in Hawaii
Video games set in Japan
Video games set in Mexico
Video System games
Windows games
Xbox One games
Video games developed in Japan
Hamster Corporation games